How Yukong Moved the Mountains is a series of 12 documentary films directed by Marceline Loridan-Ivens and Joris Ivens about the Cultural Revolution. Ivens and his partner Loridan worked on the film between 1972 and 1974, and it was finally released in France in 1976. The film's title refers to Yugong Yishan, an ancient fable about the virtues of perseverance and willpower. At 763 minutes, it is one of the longest theatrical films by running time.

Contents

For English-language distribution, the film was shown in five feature-length parts:

A Woman, A Family; Rehearsal at the Peking Opera
The Fishing Village; The Football Incident; Training at the Peking Circus
The Pharmacy; Traditional Handicrafts; An Army Camp
The Generator Factory; Professor Tsien
The Oilfields; Impressions of a City - Shanghai

Reception

The segment The Football Incident was awarded Best Documentary Short at the 1977 César Awards.

See also
List of longest films by running time

Notes

References

External links
 

1976 documentary films
1976 films
Chinese propaganda films
Films directed by Joris Ivens
French documentary films
1970s French-language films
Documentary films about China
Films about the Cultural Revolution
1970s French films